Guinguette by the Seine (Fr. La Guinguette a deux sous, "the Tuppenny Bar") is a detective novel by Belgian writer Georges Simenon, featuring his character Inspector Jules Maigret.

Plot summary
While visiting a condemned man in prison, he comments to Maigret that he knows someone at a "guinguette a deux sous"  (a "tuppenny bar") who is equally deserving of the death penalty. Lenoir further reveals that he and an accomplice had witnessed a man whom they knew from the bar take a body and dump it in the Canal Saint-Martin. 
Maigret is unable to find this tuppenny bar, but later he chances to overhear a man mention it; following him, Maigret discovers he is M. Basso, a businessman, married and with a mistress, who leads him to a party at an inn on the Seine at Morsang. Mingling with the crowd, Maigret is invited to join the party by James, an English bank clerk, and discovers they meet regularly there at weekends. 
Now part of the set, Maigret returns the following week, where one of the men, Feinstein, is shot dead by Basso after an altercation.
Now Maigret has two deaths to investigate; he also uncovers blackmail, murder, adultery and financial irregularities in the gay social set before unmasking the murderer.

Maigret's method
Simenon describes Maigret's view of the turning point in an investigation; where it goes from a frustrating search for any lead at all, to the point where they start to come thick and fast.

He also describes an investigation as a matter of painstaking labour and good luck; how after instigating a county-wide search for a suspect, he was eventually found when an off-duty policeman became suspicious of an old woman buying 22f worth of ham, far more than she would need for herself.

Other titles
The book has been translated twice into English: In 1940, by Geoffrey Sainsbury (and reprinted variously as "Maigret to the Rescue", "A Spot by the Seine", and "Maigret and the Tavern by the Seine") and in 2003 by David Watson as "The Bar on the Seine" (reprinted in 2015 as "The Two-Penny Bar").

Adaptations
The story has been dramatized twice; in 1962 as The Wedding Guest (with Rupert Davies in the main role), and in 1975 as La Guinguette a deux sous (Jean Richard).

Notes

References
 Georges Simenon The Bar by the Seine (1931; translated G Sainsbury, reprinted 2003) Penguin Classics, London

External links

 Maigret at trussel.com

1931 Belgian novels
Maigret novels
Novels set in France
Novels set in the 20th century